The 2018 Fergana Challenger is a professional tennis tournament played on hard courts. It is the 19th edition of the tournament for men which is part of the 2018 ATP Challenger Tour, and the eighth edition of the event for women on the 2018 ITF Women's Circuit. It takes place in Fergana, Uzbekistan between 18–24 June 2018.

Men's singles main draw entrants

Seeds 

 1 Rankings as of 11 June 2018.

Other entrants 
The following players received wildcards into the singles main draw:
  Farrukh Dustov
  Sanjar Fayziev
  Khumoyun Sultanov
  Denis Yevseyev

The following players received entry from the qualifying draw:
  Konstantin Kravchuk
  Saketh Myneni
  Shuichi Sekiguchi
  Wu Tung-lin

Women's singles main draw entrants

Seeds 

 1 Rankings as of 11 June 2018.

Other entrants 
The following players received wildcards into the singles main draw:
  Nigora Azimjanova
  Nasiba Espolova
  Arina Folts
  Elina Sharipova

The following players received entry from the qualifying draw:
  Isabella Bozicevic
  Sai Samhitha Chamarthi
  Ilona Kremen
  Natasha Palha
  Kamilla Rakhimova
  Vitalia Stamat
  Sadafmoh Tolibova
  Guzal Yusupova

Champions

Men's singles 

  Nikola Milojević def.  Enrique López Pérez 6–3, 6–4.

Women's singles 
  Nigina Abduraimova def.  Anastasia Frolova, 6–3, 2–0 ret.

Men's doubles 

  Ivan Gakhov /  Alexander Pavlioutchenkov def.  Saketh Myneni /  Vijay Sundar Prashanth 6–4, 6–4.

Women's doubles 
  Anastasia Frolova /  Ekaterina Yashina def.  Sofya Lansere /  Kamilla Rakhimova, 6–1, 7–6(7–4)

External links 
 Official website

Fergana Challenger
2018 ITF Women's Circuit
2018